The 1909–10 Scottish Cup was the 37th season of Scotland's most prestigious football knockout competition. The Cup was won by Dundee who defeated Clyde 2–0 in the second replay final, after drawing 2–2 and 0–0.

Calendar

First round

Repeat

Replays

Repeat Replay

Second round

Replay

Second replay

Quarter-finals

Replays

Second replay

Semi-finals

Replay

Second Replay

Final

Replay

Second Replay

Teams

See also
1909–10 in Scottish football

References

External links
RSSSF: Scottish Cup 1909–10
Soccerbase: Scottish Cup 1909–10

1909-10
Scotland
Cup